Dobra is a commune in Dâmbovița County, Muntenia, Romania with a population of 3,773 people. It is composed of two villages, Dobra and Mărcești.

Natives
 Cornel Dinu, footballer (b. 1989)

References

Communes in Dâmbovița County
Localities in Muntenia